BWD could refer to:
 Barrels of water per day
 Bird Watcher's Digest, an American birding magazine
 Bishop Walker Dinner, an event and humanitarian award

Transport codes
 Belvandi railway station, India
 Birchwood railway station, Cheshire, England
 Brownwood Regional Airport, Texas, U.S. (IATA code)
 Burwood railway station, Melbourne, Victoria, Australia